Phuttamonthon Sai 2 Railway Halt is a railway halt located in Sala Thammasop Subdistrict, Thawi Watthana District, Bangkok.

Train services 
 Rapid 178 Lang Suan–Thon Buri
 Ordinary 251/252 Bang Sue Junction–Prachuap Khiri Khan–Bang Sue Junction
 Ordinary 254 Lang Suan–Thon Buri
 Ordinary 351/352 Thon Buri–Ratchaburi–Thon Buri
 Commuter 355/356 Bangkok–Suphan Buri–Bangkok
 Commuter 919/920 [1,2,3,4,5] Thon Buri–Salaya–Thon Buri

References 
 
 

Railway stations in Thailand